A medic is a person involved in medicine such as a medical doctor,  medical student, paramedic or an emergency medical responder.

Among physicians in the UK, the term "medic" indicates someone who has followed a "medical" career path in postgraduate professional training accredited by a College of Physicians, such as cardiology or endocrinology, in contrast to a surgical branch of specialisation accredited by a College of Surgeons.

Types
"Medic" titled roles include:
 Emergency physician, a medical doctor (M.D. or D.O.) who has specialized postgraduate training in emergency diagnostics and treatment
 Combat Medical Technician, a soldier with a specialist military trade within the Royal Army Medical Corps of the British Army
 Combat medic (in various nations)
 Corpsman, a sailor who is trained for providing first aid to members of the US Armed Forces, combat casualty care/trauma care on the battlefield (This name is only used by the Navy and Marine Corps for the Hospital Corpsmen who serve in either a Navy or Marine billet; other branches use the term "medic".)
 4N0X1, an Air Force Emergency Medical Technician
 68W, the Military Occupational Specialty for the United States Army's health care specialist (combat medic)
 1Z1X1, The United States Air Force Pararescue

See also

 Advanced life support
 Basic life support
 Emergency medical service
 Medical encyclopedia
 National Association of Emergency Medical Technicians
 National Registry of Emergency Medical Technicians
 Triage

References

Emergency medical responders